Doctor on the Brain is a 1972 comedy novel by the British writer Richard Gordon. Part of the long-running Doctor series, it takes place at St Swithan's Hospital.

References

Bibliography
 Pringle, David. Imaginary People: A Who's who of Fictional Characters from the Eighteenth Century to the Present Day. Scolar Press, 1996.

1972 British novels
Novels by Richard Gordon
Comedy novels
Novels set in hospitals
Heinemann (publisher) books